Philip Joseph Gallivan (May 29, 1907 – November 24, 1969) was a pitcher in Major League Baseball. He died in St. Paul, Minnesota on November 24, 1969.

He is buried in Hudson, Wisconsin.

External links

1907 births
1960 deaths
Baseball players from Washington (state)
Major League Baseball pitchers
Brooklyn Robins players
Chicago White Sox players
Baltimore Orioles scouts
Brooklyn Dodgers scouts
Enid Boosters players
Tulsa Oilers (baseball) players
Texarkana Twins players
Waco Cubs players
Macon Peaches players
Fort Worth Panthers players
Hartford Senators players
Jersey City Skeeters players
Buffalo Bisons (minor league) players
Indianapolis Indians players
Burials in Wisconsin